Odonestis vita is a moth of the family Lasiocampidae first described by Frederic Moore in 1859. Three former subspecies are now recognized as separate species.

Distribution
It is found from the Indian subregion to Sundaland, Thailand, Thailand, China, Vietnam, Borneo, Sumatra, Java and the Philippines.

Description
The body is orange red. The forewings are short and more compact with irregular postmedial lines. The white discal spot and the fasciae are indistinct. Caterpillars are recorded from plants like Eugenia, Psidium and Lagerstroemia species.

Current subspecies
In earlier classifications recorded six subspecies including the nominate race. However, recently O. v. belli, O. v. ceylonica and O. v. leopoldi were elevated to species level.

Former subspecies

References

External links
Odonestis vita

Moths of Asia
Moths described in 1859